Peggy Kaplan is an American bridge player.

Kaplan lives in Minnesota. Kaplan was one of the contributing editors to the 7th edition of The Official Encyclopedia of Bridge.

Bridge accomplishments

Wins

 North American Bridge Championships (5)
 Freeman Mixed Board-a-Match (1) 2011 
 Chicago Mixed Board-a-Match (1) 2005 
 Fast Open Pairs (1) 2009 
 Rockwell Mixed Pairs (1) 2004

Runners-up

 North American Bridge Championships (1)
 Machlin Women's Swiss Teams (1) 2007

Notes

American contract bridge players
Living people
Year of birth missing (living people)